Stictis is a genus of lichenized fungi in the family Stictidaceae.

Species

, Species Fungorum accepts 42 species of Stictis:
 Stictis anhuiensis 
 Stictis arundinacea 
 Stictis asteliae 
 Stictis brunnescens 
 Stictis carnea 
 Stictis chrysopsis 
 Stictis clavata 
 Stictis collospermi 
 Stictis confusa 
 Stictis cordylines 
 Stictis dealbata 
 Stictis dicksoniae 
 Stictis dumontii 
 Stictis ecclesiensis 
 Stictis elevata 
 Stictis elongatispora 
 Stictis friabilis 
 Stictis fuscella 
 Stictis graminicola 
 Stictis graminum 
 Stictis hawaiensis 
 Stictis himalayana 
 Stictis immersa 
 Stictis inconstans 
 Stictis laciniata 
 Stictis lata 
 Stictis leucospermi 
 Stictis mollis 
 Stictis pachyspora 
 Stictis palniensis 
 Stictis paucula 
 Stictis populorum 
 Stictis prominens 
 Stictis serenoae 
 Stictis serpentaria 
 Stictis stellata 
 Stictis subbrachyspora 
 Stictis subiculata 
 Stictis tortilis 
 Stictis trinervia 
 Stictis urceolata 
 Stictis virginea

References

External links

Ostropales
Lichen genera
Ostropales genera
Taxa named by Christiaan Hendrik Persoon
Taxa described in 1800